Redwood Creek may refer to:
 Redwood Creek (Alameda County), in California
 Redwood Creek (Humboldt County), in California
 Redwood Creek (Marin County), in California
 Redwood Creek (San Mateo County), in California

Redwood Creek may also be:
 Redwood Creek, in Mendocino County, California
 Redwood Creek, in Warren County, Indiana

See also
 Pfeiffer-Redwood Creek, tributary of the Big Sur River